Kaestneria is a genus of  dwarf spiders that was first described by H. Wiehle in 1956.

Species
 it contains eight species, found in Canada, China, Czech Republic, Hungary, Indonesia, Japan, Malaysia, Mongolia, Poland, Romania, Russia, Slovakia, Ukraine, and the United States:
Kaestneria bicultrata Chen & Yin, 2000 – China, Indonesia (Sumatra, Belitung Is.)
Kaestneria dorsalis (Wider, 1834) (type) – Europe, Russia (Europe to South Siberia)
Kaestneria longissima (Zhu & Wen, 1983) – Russia (Far East), China
Kaestneria minima Locket, 1982 – Malaysia
Kaestneria pullata (O. Pickard-Cambridge, 1863) – North America, Europe, Russia (Europe to Far East), China, Mongolia, Japan
Kaestneria rufula (Hackman, 1954) – USA, Canada
Kaestneria torrentum (Kulczyński, 1882) – Poland, Czechia, Slovakia, Hungary, Romania, Ukraine
Kaestneria valentissima Irfan & Peng, 2018 – China

See also
 List of Linyphiidae species (I–P)

References

Araneomorphae genera
Linyphiidae
Spiders of Asia
Spiders of North America